Doone is a surname. Notable people with the surname include:
James Joseph Hayes Doone (1888–1953), Canadian lawyer and political figure in New Brunswick
Lorna Doone (disambiguation)
Rupert Doone (1903–1966), English dancer, choreographer, theatre director, and teacher
The Courage of Marge O'Doone, 1920 drama film directed by David Smith and featuring Boris Karloff
 The Curse of Doone, a 1928 novel by Sydney Horler